Third rail is an extra rail used for supplying electricity to trains.

Third rail may also refer to:

Third rail (model railroading), in rail transport modelling, a technique that is sometimes applied in order to facilitate easier wiring
The extra rail on a dual gauge railway
"Third Rail" (song), a 1993 song by Squeeze
Third rail of politics, a political metaphor
The Third Rail, an online magazine about transportation
The Third Rail (band), an American pop group
Emergency Third Rail Power Trip, an album by Rain Parade
Third Rail (TV series), a Singaporean TV drama series
Third Rail (MLS supporters association), an independent supporters' group for New York City FC
Third Rail Releasing, a distribution banner of The Weinstein Company
 The Third Rail (album), a 1996 album by New York City-based blues rock band Railroad Jerk
 A Guard rail (rail), used to prevent a train from derailing.

See also
 Three-cushion billiards, also called "three-rail"